Pfahnl is a traditional mill company in Pregarten, Austria. The first written record about it is from 1472; and now the Mill is its 18th generation from the same family (Andreas and Herbert Pfahnl continue the production).
Production include: 
high-quality flours (wheat, rye, organic)
ready-to-use flour
pastry products (cream and decora products, pastry mixes, pastry products, concentrates and premixes), etc.
Daily about 240 tonnes of grain are ground to a wheat and a rye flour.

See also 
List of oldest companies

References

External links 
Homepage

Food and drink companies of Austria
Economy of Upper Austria
Companies established in the 15th century
15th-century establishments in Austria